The Belfry is a golf resort and hotel in Wishaw, Warwickshire, close to Sutton Coldfield, England, located approximately 8 miles from the centre of Birmingham. It was acquired by KSL Capital Partners in August 2012.

The resort has three golf courses. The Brabazon Course is the main tournament course, and the others are the PGA National and The Derby. The headquarters of The Professional Golfers' Association are also located there, along with a 4-star hotel, tennis courts and a leisure spa.

The Belfry has hosted the Ryder Cup on four occasions and has staged numerous European Tour events.

In 2013, The Belfry underwent a comprehensive £26 million renovation of all bedrooms, meeting rooms, public spaces and other amenities. There was also a general uplift on the whole grounds appearance, including a new lobby entrance. The hotel remained open during the renovations and they were successfully completed. Further work has since been undertaken to improve other areas of the resort, including the spa. Sam's Bar, named after Scottish golfer and 2002 Ryder Cup Captain Sam Torrance, was also refurbished and renamed to Sam's Club House.

The Belfry won the World's Best Golf Hotel 2019 at the World Golf Awards, Abu Dhabi.

Awards

The Belfry has won a number of awards including:

 England's Leading Golf Resort 2015
 England's Leading Golf Resort 2011
 England's Leading Golf Resort 2004

Ryder Cup

European Tour

References

External links

 The Belfry Official site

Golf clubs and courses in Warwickshire
Hotel spas
Hotels in Warwickshire
Ryder Cup venues
Sports venues in Warwickshire